David Ingram (dates uncertain) was a 16th-century English sailor and explorer who claimed to have walked across the interior of the North American continent from Mexico to Nova Scotia in 1568.  Ingram signed on with English privateer John Hawkins in 1567 to raid and trade along the coasts of Portuguese Africa and Spanish Mexico.  In November 1567, he was marooned with some 100 of his shipmates near Tampico on the coast of Mexico, about 200 miles south of the present Texas/Mexico border.  Ingram and two dozen of his party struck out northward into the interior to avoid capture by the Spanish, and disappeared off the map.  11 months later, in October 1568, Ingram and two others of his original party were picked up from the coast of Nova Scotia by a French fishing vessel.  How they got there is attested only by Ingram's own account, written down 13 years later in 1582 by Sir Francis Walsingham (Ingram himself was illiterate) and published in 1589 in Richard Hakluyt's The Principall Navigations Voiages and Discoveries of the English Nation of 1589. Hakluyt's second edition in 1599 did not contain Ingram's account, possibly suggesting Hakluyt's doubts about it. Samuel Purchas commented on this writing that “It seemeth some incredibilities of his reports caused him to leave him out in the next impression, the reward of lying [being] not to be believed in truths.”  Ingram returned to the new world in 1583 with Sir Humphrey Gilbert in his unsuccessful attempt to establish an English settlement in Newfoundland.

He reported a populous and prosperous land dotted with large settlements, divided into a multitude of what he calls kingdoms with kings "carried by men in a sumptuous chaire of Siluer or Christal, garnished with divers sortes of precious stones.", mostly friendly and eager to help him along his journey.  Much of his description of the country and its inhabitants seems fanciful, at least partly cobbled together from things he had seen or heard in his travels up and down the coasts of Africa and South America (he reported encountering elephants, a beast with "eyes and mouth … in his breast," and great cities "five or eight miles one from the other", e.g. "Bariniah, a Citie a mile and a quarter long," and that the Indians called certain birds "penguins" which he thought was just one of many Welsh words they used).  Nevertheless, it is peppered with intriguing tidbits, including what may be the first recorded description of an American bison.

Some scholars have questioned the entire story on the grounds that it would have been physically impossible to walk over 3,000 miles through the wilderness in only 11 months, but in 1999 British writer Richard Nathan retraced Ingram's journey in reverse, walking from Nova Scotia to Tampico in just 9 months.

References

External links
 Ingram's Improbable Walk Across 16th-Century America
 "The Long, Forgotten Walk of David Ingram" by John Toohey

English explorers
Year of death unknown
Year of birth unknown